Alexander Hahn may refer to:

 Alexander Hahn (footballer) (born 1993), German footballer
 Alexander Hahn (artist) (born 1954), Swiss artist